Hidetaka Monma (October 23, 1973), is a Japanese mixed martial artist who last competed in 2014. A professional since 2001, he competed for Pancrase, DREAM, DEEP, RINGS, and K-1 HERO'S.

Background
Monma began training in jujutsu at age of 13 and in MMA at age of 25, when he joined Wajyutsu Keisyukai A-3 and made his professional debut on September 21, 2001 against Hiroshiji Ito at RINGS Battle Genesis Vol.8. Monma later started Wajyutsu Keisyukai Brightness.

Mixed martial arts record

|-
| Loss
| align=center| 18–11–4
| Ken Hamamura 
| TKO (corner stoppage)
| DEEP: 66 Impact
| 
| align=center| 2
| align=center| 2:02
| Tokyo, Japan
|
|-
| Win
| align=center| 18–10–4
| Junya Nishikawa
| Submission (arm-triangle choke)
| Grabaka Live! 3
| 
| align=center| 1
| align=center| 2:40
| Tokyo, Japan
|Lightweight debut.
|-
| Loss
| align=center| 17–10–4
| Yuki Sasaki
| Decision (unanimous)
| Grabaka Live: 1st Cage Attack
| 
| align=center| 3
| align=center| 5:00
| Tokyo, Japan
| 
|-
| Win
| align=center| 17–9–4
| Yoshihisa Yamamoto
| Submission (arm-triangle choke)
| DEEP: 50 Impact
| 
| align=center| 1
| align=center| 1:07
| Tokyo, Japan
| 
|-
| Draw
| align=center| 16–9–4
| Ryuki Ueyama
| Draw
| DEEP: 47 Impact
| 
| align=center| 3
| align=center| 5:00
| Tokyo, Japan
| 
|-
| Win
| align=center| 16–9–3
| Dong Hyun Kim
| Decision (Unanimous)
| DEEP: Fan Thanksgiving Festival 2
| 
| align=center| 2
| align=center| 5:00
| Tokyo, Japan
| 
|-
| Loss
| align=center| 15–9–3
| Seichi Ikemoto
| TKO (knee to the body and punches)
| DEEP: 40 Impact
| 
| align=center| 1
| align=center| 1:42
| Tokyo, Japan
|  For the DEEP Welterweight Championship.
|-
| Win
| align=center| 15–8–3
| Andre Mafetoni
| Submission (guillotine choke)
| GCM: Cage Force EX Eastern Bound
| 
| align=center| 1
| align=center| 4:47
| Tokyo, Japan
| 
|-
| Loss
| align=center| 14–8–3
| Hayato Sakurai
| TKO (punches)
| DREAM 1: Lightweight Grand Prix 2008 First Round
| 
| align=center| 1
| align=center| 4:12
| Saitama, Japan
| 
|-
| Win
| align=center| 14–7–3
| Yong Hoon Lee
| Submission (armbar)
| GCM: Cage Force EX Eastern Bound
| 
| align=center| 1
| align=center| 1:44
| Tokyo, Japan
| 
|-
| Loss
| align=center| 13–7–3
| Dan Hardy
| TKO (corner stoppage)
| GCM: Cage Force 4
| 
| align=center| 3
| align=center| 0:28
| Tokyo, Japan
| 
|-
| Win
| align=center| 13–6–3
| Janne Tulirinta
| Submission (omoplata)
| GCM: Cage Force 2
| 
| align=center| 1
| align=center| 1:48
| Tokyo, Japan
| 
|-
| Loss
| align=center| 12–6–3
| Luigi Fioravanti
| TKO (punches)
| GCM: D.O.G. 7
| 
| align=center| 1
| align=center| 2:31
| Tokyo, Japan
| 
|-
| Loss
| align=center| 12–5–3
| Gesias Cavalcante
| TKO (punches)
| HERO'S 5
| 
| align=center| 1
| align=center| 2:08
| Tokyo, Japan
|HERO'S 2006 Middleweight Grand Prix Opening Round.
|-
| Draw
| align=center| 12–4–3
| Rodrigo Gracie
| Draw
| MARS World Grand Prix
| 
| align=center| 3
| align=center| 5:00
| Tokyo, Japan
| 
|-
| Win
| align=center| 12–4–2
| Jess Liaudin
| Submission (armbar)
| GCM: D.O.G. 3
| 
| align=center| 1
| align=center| 2:14
| Tokyo, Japan
| 
|-
| Win
| align=center| 11–4–2
| Dave Strasser
| KO (punch)
| GCM: D.O.G. 2
| 
| align=center| 1
| align=center| 3:30
| Tokyo, Japan
| 
|-
| Win
| align=center| 10–4–2
| Chatt Lavender
| Submission (triangle choke)
| GCM: D.O.G. 1
| 
| align=center| 1
| align=center| 2:40
| Tokyo, Japan
| 
|-
| Loss
| align=center| 9–4–2
| Hidehiko Hasegawa
| Decision (unanimous)
| Pancrase: Brave 12
| 
| align=center| 3
| align=center| 5:00
| Tokyo, Japan
| 
|-
| Win
| align=center| 9–3–2
| Takafumi Ito
| Submission (triangle choke)
| Pancrase: Brave 9
| 
| align=center| 1
| align=center| 1:34
| Tokyo, Japan
| 
|-
| Draw
| align=center| 8–3–2
| Hiroyuki Nozawa
| Draw (unanimous)
| Pancrase: 2004 Neo-Blood Tournament Final
| 
| align=center| 2
| align=center| 5:00
| Tokyo, Japan
| 
|-
| Loss
| align=center| 8–3–1
| Takuya Wada
| Decision (majority) 
| Pancrase: Brave 5
| 
| align=center| 3
| align=center| 5:00
| Tokyo, Japan
| 
|-
| Win
| align=center| 8–2–1
| Seichi Ikemoto
| Submission (arm triangle choke) 
| DEEP: 13th Impact
| 
| align=center| 2
| align=center| 3:53
| Tokyo, Japan
| 
|-
| Draw
| align=center| 7–2–1
| Hiroki Nagaoka
| Draw
| GCM: Demolition 030923
| 
| align=center| 2
| align=center| 5:00 	
| Japan
| 
|-
| Loss
| align=center| 7–2
| Eiji Ishikawa
| Decision (unanimous)
| Pancrase: 2003 Neo-Blood Tournament Second Round
| 
| align=center| 3
| align=center| 5:00 	
| Tokyo, Japan
| 
|-
| Loss
| align=center| 7–1
| Kiuma Kunioku
| Decision (unanimous)
| Pancrase: Hybrid 4
| 
| align=center| 2
| align=center| 5:00 	
| Tokyo, Japan
| 
|-
| Win
| align=center| 7–0 
| Hiroyuki Ito
| Decision
| GCM: Demolition 030126
| 
| align=center| 2
| align=center| 5:00
| Tokyo, Japan
| 
|-
| Win
| align=center| 6–0 
| Satoru Kitaoka
| KO (knee)
| Pancrase: 2002 Neo-Blood Tournament Second Round
| 
| align=center| 1
| align=center| 0:05
| Tokyo, Japan
| Neo-Blood Tournament Final.
|-
| Win
| align=center| 5–0 
| Masashi Suzuki
| Submission (triangle armbar)
| Pancrase: 2002 Neo-Blood Tournament Second Round
| 
| align=center| 2
| align=center| 3:48
| Tokyo, Japan
| Neo-Blood Tournament Semifinal Round.
|-
| Win
| align=center| 4–0 
| Kazuki Okubo
| Decision (split)
| Pancrase: 2002 Neo-Blood Tournament Second Round
| 
| align=center| 3
| align=center| 5:00
| Tokyo, Japan
| Neo-Blood Tournament Opening Round.
|-
| Win
| align=center| 3–0 
| Hidehisa Matsuda
| Submission (triangle choke)
| GCM: ORG 2nd
| 
| align=center| 1
| align=center| 2:35
| Tokyo, Japan
| 
|-
| Win
| align=center| 2–0 
| Kyosuke Sasaki
| Decision (majority)
| RINGS: World Title Series 5
| 
| align=center| 2
| align=center| 5:00
| Kanagawa, Japan
| 
|-
| Win
| align=center| 1–0 
| Hiroyuki Ito
| Decision (majority)
| RINGS: Battle Genesis Vol. 8
| 
| align=center| 3
| align=center| 5:00
| Tokyo, Japan
|

References 

Living people
1973 births
Japanese male mixed martial artists
Welterweight mixed martial artists
Middleweight mixed martial artists
Mixed martial artists utilizing jujutsu
Japanese jujutsuka
Sportspeople from Tokyo
Wajitsu Keishukai